Eva Hrdinová and Shahar Pe'er were the defending champions, but chose not to participate.

Natela Dzalamidze and Valeriya Strakhova won the title, defeating Kanae Hisami and Kotomi Takahata in the final, 6–2, 6–1.

Seeds

Draw

References 
 Draw

Reinert Open - Doubles
Reinert Open